Antikamnia Chemical Company (1890–1930), named after its patent medicine Antikamnia, was an American pharmaceutical company based in St. Louis that manufactured supposed cures for pains with the main ingredient being acetanilid, which was known to be toxic in high doses or in sensitive individuals. They produced a range of products with mixtures of therapeutic chemicals including both quinine and heroin. Unlike quack cures of the time, they contained potent chemicals but these were not carefully tested and were considered as nostrums by many physicians of the time. The company however made huge profits through clever advertising and marketing of the product targeting physicians, using physician testimonials and finding loopholes in the Pure Food and Drug Act of 1906.

History 

Antikamnia (derived from the Greek and meaning "opposed to pain") was founded by Frank A. Ruf and Louis E. Frost who had worked together in the Mellier Drug Company. The company was incorporated on April 10, 1890 in Illinois and expanded the next year to Missouri. Frost was a graduate from the St. Louis College of Pharmacy, while Ruf had worked as a drug clerk. The company produced a number of products including Antikamnia Powders and Tablets; Antikamnia and Codeine; Antikamnia and Quinine; Antikamnia, Quinine and Salol; and Antikamnia and Heroin, which were all sold over the counter. While the product was proprietary and the formulation a secret, it had been investigated and it was established that the main ingredient was acetanilid, with sodium bicarbonate, citric acid, and caffeine as additives. Acetanilid had been synthesized by German chemists in 1886 and had been tested as an analgesic (for pain relief) and antipyretic (for fever) on 24 patients. Only one patient had showed cyanosis, a symptom of acetanilid toxicity, but this patient had recovered soon after. The first death from Antikamnia was reported in 1891 followed by an increasing number of cases over the years. After the Pure Food and Drug Act of 1906 was passed which required labels to indicate dangerous drugs, the company substituted acetanilid with the less toxic derivative acetphenetidin.  A 1910 lawsuit by the state against the company declared that the regulation required them to indicate that acetphenetidin was a derivative of acetanilid. The company claimed that the law did not state so. The company won the case but it was appealed and heard in 1914 by the U.S. Supreme Court, who ruled in favor of the government. The American Medical Association became increasingly critical of the products, and several articles calling it the "Antikamnia Fraud" appeared in journals. One physician, M.V. Ball, stopped his subscription to the Journal of the American Medical Association for carrying Antikamnia advertisements.

In 1919 the company renamed itself the Antikamnia Remedy Company. Ruf died a millionaire in 1923.  He had diversified his investments, started several other industries, become an art collector, and risen into high society. The company declined after this and was bought up by Block Drug Company in 1930. Louis Frost ran several drug stores in St. Louis, moved to Springfield, Illinois in 1906, and became the editor of a farm journal The Berkshire World.

References

External links 

 United States v. Antikamnia Chemical Co. (D.C. Cir. 1911)
 Antikamnia calendars
Pharmaceutical companies of the United States
Patent medicines